The Socotra starling (Onychognathus frater) is a species of starling in the family Sturnidae. It is endemic to Yemen.

Its natural habitats are subtropical or tropical dry forest, subtropical or tropical moist lowland forest, subtropical or tropical dry shrubland, subtropical or tropical high-altitude shrubland, and rural gardens. It is threatened by habitat loss.

References

Birds described in 1881
Endemic birds of Socotra
Onychognathus
Taxa named by Philip Sclater
Taxonomy articles created by Polbot